AZC or azc may refer to:

 American Zionist Council, a defunct Israeli lobby group formed in 1949
 AZC, the FAA LID code for Colorado City Municipal Airport, Arizona, United States
 azc, the ISO 639-5 code for Uto-Aztecan languages, in Western United States and Mexico